HMIS Assam was a World War II  of the Royal Indian Navy. She was originally ordered for and commissioned as HMS Bugloss of the Royal Navy, but transferred to the Royal Indian Navy immediately upon commissioning. She was transferred back to the Royal Navy in 1947 and subsequently scrapped.

History
Bugloss was ordered from John Crown & Sons Ltd for the Royal Navy 1942. She was transferred to the Royal Indian Navy immediately upon commissioning in 1945, and served as Assam until her transfer back to the Royal Navy in 1947.

Operations in World War II
Assam joined the Eastern Fleet just months before the end of World War II. She escorted numerous convoys in 1945 during the war.

Notes

 

1943 ships
Flower-class corvettes of the Royal Indian Navy